A belly chain (also known as a waist chain or Martin chain) is a physical restraint worn by prisoners, consisting of a chain around the waist, to which the prisoner's hands may be chained or cuffed. Sometimes the ankles are also connected by means of longer chains.

Usage 
Such restraints are often used in the United States in courtrooms, or for transporting prisoners, or in other public situations as a safeguard against escape. They are used above all when detainees are to be restrained over a longer period of time, for example during transport or at court hearings. Belly chains are used because there still remains a relatively large freedom of movement to the detainee when their hands are cuffed in front of the body. As an alternative, the hands could be cuffed behind the detainee's back, but this will soon inflict discomfort and even pain when being handcuffed like this for a longer period of time. Therefore, as a more gentle but almost equally secure alternative to cuffing the detainee's hands behind their back, the hands are cuffed to a belly chain and thus shackled to the detainee's waist.

Types 
There are essentially two types of belly chains:
One type consists of a chain with handcuffs attached to the front or at the side. Peerless Model 7002 or Smith & Wesson Model 1800 have the handcuffs attached on both sides by a short chain.  This allows some movement (e. g. for signing court papers or pointing at pieces of evidence during testimony), though restricting arm motion to prevent the prisoner from butting or hitting. CTS Thompson Model 7008 has the handcuffs attached on the sides too, but the handcuffs are directly linked to the belly chain, so that the detainee's hands are tightly attached to their waist; compared to the other models, this provides a rather more severe restraint. Furthermore, there are combinations like Peerless Model 7705, where the belly chain is connected by a longer chain with a pair of leg irons. This type of combination further restricts the detainee's freedom of movement and prevents them from running and escape; the chain running down from the belly chain to the leg irons holds the leg irons' chain just off the ground to prevent it from dragging and catching. Such combinations are commonly referred to as "full harness" or "H-style" restraints. When applying this type of belly chain, the chain is first placed tightly around the detainee's waist and secured behind the back with a padlock. Then, the handcuffs are put on the detainee's wrists; the cuffs should always be double locked once applied. In the standard procedure, the prisoner's hands are fixed either in front of the body or parallel at the side of the waist, thus limiting the detainee's freedom of movement. When using such a belly chain to restrain high-risk inmates, the detainee can also be shackled with their arms crossed so that the left wrist is placed in the cuff on the right side of their waist and vice versa. This high-security use reminds of a straitjacket.
 The other type consists of a chain with slightly larger links and a steel loop (called martin link) at one end. The chain is placed around the detainee's waist and the steel loop is plugged through a chain link. Then, a pair of handcuffs is inserted in the loop and the cuffs are then put on the detainee's wrists; again, the handcuffs should be double locked when applied. The loose end of the belly chain can be secured with a snap hook or a padlock behind the detainee's back. As in this configuration the belly chain cannot be removed unless the handcuffs have been removed first, this type of belly chain does not necessarily need a padlock for fixing. Also, the length of the chain is designed to fit around the waist of almost every person, including slim and rather stout individuals. For high security transports, the martin link belly chain can be used with security handcuff covers such as the C & S Security Black Box or the CTS Thompson Blue Box. These are hard plastic boxes with a metallic slider and are placed over the handcuffs so that the key holes are hidden by the box. On the one hand, the security cover prevents the detainee from manipulating the keyhole of the handcuffs, for instance if they gets hold of a handcuff key or a lockpick. On the other hand, freedom of movement is further restricted, as the handcuff cover converts standard chain link handcuffs into rigid cuffs.

Restraint belts 
Leather or nylon belts are often used instead of belly chains. These restraint belts have a metal ring on the front, through which the handcuffs are plugged and then put on the detainee's wrists. The belt is then placed around the detainee's waist and secured with a buckle; some models can also be locked with a padlock.

Gallery
The following pictures illustrate the different types of restraints and their application:

References

Chains
Physical restraint
Law enforcement equipment
Penal imprisonment